Damian Lanigan is a British writer. He has written two novels - Stretch 29 and The Chancers.  He is the writer and series creator of BBC Three sitcom Massive. He wrote the play Dissonance, which debuted at the Williamstown Theater Festival in 2007 before being premiered in New York City at the  Bay Street Theater, Sag Harbor in 2010.

References

External links

Living people
British writers
Year of birth missing (living people)